This is a list of Parkruns in the Australia. Parkrun is the name given to the collection of 5K runs that take place every Saturday morning at different locations throughout the country. Events take place in a range of general locations including city parks, national parks, forests, rivers, lakes, reservoirs, beaches, racecourses and nature reserves. Parkruns start at different times across Australia with Parkruns in Queensland and Northern Territory starting at 7am, in Victoria, NSW, ACT, SA and WA starting at 8am, and events in Tasmania at 9am.

The runs are all 5 km in length but have different degrees of difficulty. The running surfaces vary: many city park Parkruns are run on tarmac footpaths, closed roads, grass or a mixture of all three, while forest and country park Parkruns are more likely to be on trails. The weather affects the difficulty of the course, with trail runs more liable to be affected by mud or leaves than runs on tarmac paths.

List of Parkruns

See also
Parkrun
List of Parkruns in the United Kingdom
List of Parkruns in the United States of America
List of Parkruns in France

References

External links 
 

Parkrun
Sport of athletics-related lists
5K runs
Running events
Trail running competitions
Road running competitions